Wulfe Balk (born 24 November 1955) is a Canadian fencer. He competed in the individual and team sabre events at the 1988 Summer Olympics.

References

External links
 

1955 births
Living people
Canadian male fencers
Olympic fencers of Canada
Fencers at the 1988 Summer Olympics
Sportspeople from St Andrews
Scottish emigrants to Canada
Pan American Games medalists in fencing
Pan American Games bronze medalists for Canada
Fencers at the 1987 Pan American Games